Dog-piling, or a dog-pile is a form of online harassment or online abuse characterized by having groups of harassers target the same victim. Examples of online abuse include flaming, doxing (online release of personal information without consent), impersonation, and public shaming. Dog-pilers often focus on harassing, exposing, or punishing a target for an opinion that the group does not agree with, or just simply for the sake of being a bully and targeting a victim. Participants use criticism and/or insults  to target a single person. In some definitions, it also includes sending private messages.

History 
Today, the use of dog-pile is most popular in terms of the internet in the form of online harassment. For example, the term dog-piling is used in reference to the Gamergate harassment campaign.

See also 
 Online shaming
 Flaming (Internet)
 Internet troll
 Bandwagon effect
 Mental health 
Cyberbullying 
Gamergate

References

Cyberbullying
Internet terminology